Franck R. Boulin is a French lawyer (attorney-at-law), member of the Bar of Lawyers of Paris.
He works also as an international expert in Parliamentary Development.

He was born in Neuilly-sur-Seine in December 1952.

Biography
Franck Boulin was appointed the first Secretary-General of the  Assembly of Kosovo during the Provisional Institutions of Self-Government (2001–02) before being made principal international adviser to the Assembly of Kosovo. He has worked with the United Nations Development Programme on various parliamentary capacity-building programs in North Africa, the Middle East and Southeast Asia. He is the Honorary Secretary of the Association of Secretaries-General of Parliaments, a branch of the Inter-Parliamentary Union. Franck Boulin holds a master's degree in law from Sorbonne University and a doctorate in political studies from Panthéon-Assas University, both in Paris. He has worked for 20 years as a senior legislative advisor to the French Parliament and the  German Bundestag.

Bibliography 
 A Conceptual Framework for the Development of Parliamentary Institutions", 2009, ANU College of Asia & the Pacific, http://www.parliamentarystudies.anu.edu.au/papers_etc/2009/publications/Boulin.pdf.
 Dossier pour la nouvelle plate-forme aéroportuaire'', 2001, Débat Public, https://web.archive.org/web/20081114061424/http://www.debatpublic.fr/docs/debats/01_DUCSAI/Dossier_Ducsai_8-08-01.doc, Participant.

External links
 Who's Who in International Organizations : http://www.wikitree.org/index.php?title=Franck_Boulin
 https://web.archive.org/web/20090510022038/http://www.usaid.gov/kosovo/pdf/kosovo_economic_recon_policy.pdf
 https://web.archive.org/web/20090510022038/http://www.usaid.gov/kosovo/pdf/kosovo_economic_recon_policy.pdf, EVALUATION OF THE USAID/KOSOVO ECONOMIC RECONSTRUCTION PROJECT
 http://www.un.org.vn/undp/projects/vie02007/PM_2006/training_center.htm
 http://www.un.org.vn/undp/projects/vie02007/PM_2006/fist_week_of_programming_mission.htm
 https://web.archive.org/web/20070622103249/http://www.undp.org/governance/eventsites/PARLgeneva04/lstpartgen.doc
 http://www.ipu.org/asgp-e/members.pdf
 https://web.archive.org/web/20070830020138/http://www.asgp.info/Resources/Data/Documents/SFGPHUIKIWMWNPXWRHIRDSSPKLIKCL.pdf
 https://web.archive.org/web/20090430060443/http://www.ewppp.org/programmes/southeastern_europe.php
 http://webarchiv.bundestag.de/archive/2005/0113/parlament/gremien15/a20/Kontakt.html
 https://web.archive.org/web/20091229191416/http://www.undp.org/eo/documents/ADR/ADR_Reports/ADR_Laos.pdf
 https://web.archive.org/web/20081120072842/http://www.asgp.info/Resources/Data/Documents/VAHVOSGFYBJDJPQTCLVUSKISEBMKRL.pdf

1952 births
Living people
French non-fiction writers
French diplomats
French male non-fiction writers